The Shadow of Gaby Leed is a 1921 German silent film directed by Carl Boese and starring Tzwetta Tzatschewa, Otto Gebühr and Frida Richard.

The film's sets were designed by the art director Julian Ballenstedt.

Cast
 Tzwetta Tzatschewa
 Otto Gebühr
 Frida Richard
 Carl Auen
 Grete Hollmann
 Kurt Vespermann
 Eugen Rex
 Clementine Plessner
 Wilhelm Diegelmann
 Ludwig Rex
 Arnold Marlé
 Robert Martini
 Hans Lanser-Rudolf
 Joachim Ringelnatz

References

Bibliography
 Bock, Hans-Michael & Bergfelder, Tim. The Concise CineGraph. Encyclopedia of German Cinema. Berghahn Books, 2009.

External links

1921 films
Films of the Weimar Republic
German silent feature films
Films directed by Carl Boese
German black-and-white films
1920s German films